The John Delehunty House, at 212 Main St. in Florence, Kentucky, was a historic Tudor Revival-style house built in 1920.

It was deemed significant as "a good example of the Tudor Revival style significant to Boone County in the period 1910-1940", one of just two Tudor Revival buildings in Boone County identified in a study of historic resources.

It was apparently demolished before 2015.

References

National Register of Historic Places in Boone County, Kentucky
Tudor Revival architecture in Kentucky
Houses completed in 1920
1920 establishments in Kentucky
Houses in Boone County, Kentucky
Former buildings and structures in Kentucky
Demolished but still listed on the National Register of Historic Places
Florence, Kentucky